Ahila India Naadalum Makkal Katchi is a Tamil political party in India, based amongst the Thevar caste. The party founder and president is actor Karthik. Karthik was the president of All India Forward Bloc and later left the party to start his own.

Support
The party's support largely depends on Actor Karthik's fans.

2011 Assembly elections

For the 2011 Assembly elections the party has joined the AIADMK alliance. Karthik announced his party will contest alone in 25 to 40 seats after it was not allotted any seat in the AIADMK coalition.

References

Political parties in Tamil Nadu
Political parties established in 2009
2009 establishments in Tamil Nadu